The 1901 VPI football team represented Virginia Agricultural and Mechanical College and Polytechnic Institute in the 1901 college football season. The team was led by their head coach A. B. Morrison Jr. and finished with a record of six wins and one loss (6–1).

Schedule

Original schedule 
The 1901 football schedule for VPI listed in the September 22 edition of The Richmond Dispatch was as follows:

September 28 – St. Albans in Blacksburg, Virginia (game was not played)
October 5 – St. Albans in Radford, Virginia (game was not played)
October 11 – Washington and Lee in Blacksburg (played on this date)
October 26 – North Carolina A&M in Blacksburg (game was not played)
November 9 – Clemson in Charlotte, North Carolina (game was moved to October 31 and Columbia, South Carolina)
November 16 – University of Maryland, Baltimore in Richmond, Virginia (played on this date)
November 23 – open (Stayed open)
November 28 – VMI in Norfolk, Virginia (played on this date)

The 1901 football schedule in the September 24 edition of The Roanoke Times included the following differences with the above schedule:

October 12 – Washington and Lee in Blacksburg (game was moved to October 11 and played)
October 19 – Georgetown in Washington, DC (game was played)
October 26 – Virginia in Blacksburg (game was played)
November 2 – North Carolina A&M in Blacksburg (game was not played)

VPI also hoped to schedule a game with the University of Georgia on November 9, but this game was not played.

After the games with St. Albans were not played on September 28 and October 5, The Richmond Dispatch reported that the teams would play each other at a horse and cattle show in Radford in late October. This game was not played.

Players
The following players were members of the 1901 football team according to the roster published in the 1902 and 1903 editions of The Bugle, the Virginia Tech yearbook.

See also
 1901 College Football All-Southern Team

References

VPI
Virginia Tech Hokies football seasons
VPI football